Șăulia is a commune in Mureș County, Transylvania, Romania that is composed of four villages: Leorința-Șăulia (Lőrincidűlő), Măcicășești (Szteuniadülő), Pădurea (Erdőtanya) and Șăulia. It has a population of 2,117: 87% Romanians, 10% Roma and 3% Hungarians.

References

Natives
Alexandru Rusu
Cosmin Vancea

Communes in Mureș County
Localities in Transylvania